"Holy Water" was the third single taken from Australian rock group The Triffids' Calenture album, and was released in August 1988. It was produced by Craig Leon (The Ramones, Blondie, The Bangles) and was written by lead guitarist and lead singer David McComb. This was one of only two tracks (the other was "Bury Me Deep in Love") that resulted from Leon's production of the band's fourth album. The production costs of Leon's efforts were more than the total costs of the band's break-through album, Born Sandy Devotional. The record sleeve however credits the production to Gil Norton who produced the remainder of the album with the band. The single was released as 7", 12" and CD single versions by Island Records but failed to chart in either Australia or the United Kingdom.

Background
"Holy Water" is the third single from Australian folk rock group The Triffids' fourth studio album, Calenture. It was released in August 1988. The track was written by lead guitarist and lead singer David McComb. It was produced by Craig Leon (The Ramones, Blondie, The Bangles) and is one of only two tracks (the other was "Bury Me Deep in Love") that resulted from Leon's work for Calenture. Leon had wanted to record all the tracks without the rhythm section of Martyn P. Casey on bass guitar and Alsy MacDonald on drums. According to guitarist and violinist, Robert McComb (David's brother), "Craig Leon didn't understand what we were on about... it becomes arbitrary who plays what, as long as it gets played". While David recalled, "There was a lot of that shit going on last year (1987) ... It's good to have a certain amount of disrespect for these so-called experts".

"Holy Water", set to a shuffling drum machine, hinted at The Triffids’ interest in electronica.  The track was remixed by Michael Frondelli. Wilson Neate of Perfect Sound Forever described the track as "euphoric" and cited it as an example of The Triffid's "unbridled pop sensibility [which] emerges – a development that sounds like an organic progression". Mess+Noises Lauren Zoric felt it was "blissful" and indicative of the album's "devastating ... loveliness".

The B-side, "Good Morning, Good Morning", is the band's cover version of The Beatles' track and was The Triffids's contribution to the 1988 tribute album Sgt. Pepper Knew My Father. On the 12" single, additional tracks are "Red Pony" which is taken from the 1983 album Treeless Plain, and "Raining Pleasure" is from 1984's extended play of the same name. The latter track features lead vocals by keyboardist Jill Birt.

The single was released as 7", 12" and CD single versions but failed to chart in either Australia or the United Kingdom.

Track listing

Personnel
"Holy Water" is credited to:
The Triffids members
 Jill Birt – keyboards, backing vocals, lead vocals ("Raining Pleasure")
 Martyn P. Casey – bass guitar
 Graham Lee – guitar
 Alsy MacDonald – drums, backing vocals
 David McComb – lead vocals, guitar
 Robert McComb – guitar, backing vocals, violin

Additional musicians
 Sam Brown – backing vocals
 Adam Peters – keyboards

Production details
 Michael Frondelli – remixing ("Holy Water")
 Craig Leon – producer ("Holy Water")
 Gil Norton – producer ("Holy Water")
 Nick Mainsbridge – producer ("Raining Pleasure")
 The Triffids – producer ("Raining Pleasure", "Red Pony")

Art work
 Peter Ashworth – photography
 Lawrence Watson – colour photography
 Island Art – sleeve art

References

1987 songs
The Triffids songs
Songs written by David McComb
1988 singles
Island Records singles